Gabriel Ricardo Quadri de la Torre (born 4 August 1954),  better known as Gabriel Quadri de la Torre, or simply as Gabriel Quadri, is a Mexican politician and former presidential candidate for the New Alliance Party (Spanish: Partido Nueva Alianza, PANAL), although he is not affiliated with the party. He was the presidential candidate for his party in the Mexican general elections of 2012. He is member of the Mexican Chamber of Deputies since 2021 via the right-wing party in Mexico, National Action Party.

Education

Quadri graduated from the Ibero-American University with a major in Civil engineering. He undertook graduate studies at the University of Texas  and was awarded a Master in Arts degree in Economics in 1981.  He was awarded the Walter Reuter Prize in 2010 for his several publications on climate change and the environment. In addition, Quadri has written several books on the preservation of the environment and has been a collaborator in the media.

Political career
He began as an advisor of the National Institute of Ecology during the presidency of Ernesto Zedillo (1994-2000), working under Julia Carabias, who was head of the Secretariat of the Environment and Natural Resources. He then became the general director of the Centro de Estudios Económicos; Quadri was also the chief of the External Financing sector in the Bank of Mexico. Quadri was also the founder of SIGEA, an organization dedicated to environmentalism.

Mexican general election, 2012

On 16 February 2012, the New Alliance Party (PANAL) registered Gabriel Quadri as the presidential candidate for the Mexican general elections of 2012. He was the first candidate of all presidential candidates to register for the elections at the Federal Electoral Institute. The New Alliance Party broke the coalition it had with the Institutional Revolutionary Party (PRI) and the Ecologist Green Party of Mexico (PVEM), and Quadri accepted to become candidate for the presidency. Ernesto J. Cordero, one of the three final candidates for the National Action Party (PAN), said in January 2012 that a coalition with the New Alliance could serve beneficial, and that "in politics, one has to be open to every possibility."  Josefina Vázquez Mota, the presidential candidate of the National Action Party for the 2012 elections, said that her party would not form a coalition with the New Alliance Party.

Constituent Assembly of Mexico City
Quadri was one of two New Alliance representatives elected by the voters of Mexico City to sit on the Constituent Assembly of Mexico City, which convened on September 15, 2016.

Proposals and political views
Quadri de la Torre said he represents the candidate of those who are "unsatisfied" with Mexican politics and partisanship. La Jornada mentioned that Quadri believes mediocracy is a result of Mexico's particracy, and called the citizens of the country to remember that they "are not condemned to vote for the same politicians and political parties," and that "alternatives exist." Quadri claimed in March 2012 that he is the "only candidate of the citizens" because he claims to not receive any orders, not even from his political party and Elba Esther Gordillo.

During the presidential elections, he presented his "13 points for a competitive and sustainable Mexico."

Drug policies
Quadri proposed that the issue of drug legalization should be analyzed thoroughly, and also to consider the decriminalization of narcotics. He mentioned that decriminalization should account for consumption, production, and distribution of all kinds of drugs. Mónica Gordillo, a politician from the New Alliance Party, mentioned that the solutions of the Mexican Drug War are not only "armed confrontations," and that the consideration of the legalization and decriminalization of drugs should be carried out; moreover, the New Alliance Party holds that the drug policies are a matter of "public health."

Police forces reconstruction
Quadri argues that the municipal police forces in Mexico are "corrupt" and have often aided the Mexican drug cartels, and that it is necessary to abolish their existence and replace it with a "world class Federal police corporation." He mentioned, however, that this reform is a "very long process," but that the work should be done notwithstanding how much it will take to create one. "The municipal police forces," Quadri said, "have over 2,500 corrupt officers around Mexico, who are horribly paid, unprepared, and penetrated by the organized crime groups." The ideal police force that Quadri has in mind should have "more than 350,000 officers that are qualified and well paid," so they can reach the standard of the police forces in Colombia and Chile.

Quadri believes that the Mexican Armed Forces should continue the fight against the Mexican drug cartels and "should not march back," because Mexico does not yet have an adequate police force to combat the cartels.

Pemex privatization
The presidential candidate wants to reform Pemex, Mexico's state-owned petroleum company, and privatize 49% of the company, and leave the remaining 51% to the government. Quadri believes that this reform will allow Pemex to "compete with multinational companies" and eventually construct "petroleum bases in other countries" and "give dividends." He wants Pemex to be similar to Petrobras, Brazil's semi-public energy corporation.

Same-sex marriages
Quadri supports and advocates the legalization of same-sex marriage.

Views on transgender topics 
His views on transgender topics had him expelled from a live debate on CNN Español in January 2022, where he was accused of transphobia.

Abortion and secular state
On 20 April 2012, Quadri claimed that he is not in favor of abortion, but is opposed of criminalizing women for making decisions regarding their own bodies. Instead, Quadri proposes prevention measures such as sexual education, contraception and family planning strategies. In addition, he supports the idea of maintaining Mexico a secular state.

References

External links
  13 propuestas de Gabriel Quadri, presidenciable del Panal – ADN Político

1954 births
Living people
New Alliance Party (Mexico) politicians
Politicians from Mexico City
University of Texas at Austin College of Liberal Arts alumni
Universidad Iberoamericana alumni
Members of the Constituent Assembly of Mexico City
Candidates in the 2012 Mexican presidential election
Deputies of the LXV Legislature of Mexico